Arcadia is an unincorporated community and census-designated place in Arcadia Township, Manistee County, Michigan, United States. Its population was 291 as of the 2010 census. The community is located along M-22 and the Lake Michigan shore. Arcadia has a post office with ZIP code 49613.

Geography

Demographics

Famous residents
Aviatrix Harriet Quimby was born there.

References

Unincorporated communities in Manistee County, Michigan
Unincorporated communities in Michigan
Census-designated places in Manistee County, Michigan
Census-designated places in Michigan